Dampier County is one of the 141 Cadastral divisions of New South Wales. The Deua River is the northern boundary, with land slightly to the north of the Brogo River the southern boundary. It includes Bermagui, Narooma, Bodalla, and most of the Deua National Park and Wadbilliga National Park.

Dampier County was named in honour of seaman William Dampier (1651-1715).

Parishes within this county
A full list of parishes found within this county; their current LGA and mapping coordinates to the approximate centre of each location is as follows:

References

Counties of New South Wales